Boriša Simanić (born 20 March 1998) is a Serbian professional basketball player for Casademont Zaragoza of the Liga ACB. He also represents the Serbian national team internationally.

Playing career

Crvena zvezda (2013–2021)
Boriša moved to the Crvena zvezda's youth system in December 2013 from Budućnost Bijeljina, making his senior team debut at Crvena zvezda during the 2015–16 season. He was named Most Valuable Player of the 2016 Euroleague Next Generation Tournament Finals in 2016.

Simanić made his first EuroLeague appearance on October 22, 2015 in a 71–98 loss to Real Madrid, tallying ten points and four rebounds in 28 minutes of action. He was a member of the World Select Team that played in the Nike Hoop Summit in Portland, Oregon on April 7, 2017. Coming off the bench, Simanić recorded two points, two rebounds and two blocked shots in 10:17 minutes of play.

In August 2017, Simanić was once again loaned to FMP. On June 26, 2019, Simanić signed a two-year extension for Crvena zvezda. In March 2021, the Zvezda parted ways with him.

Mega Basket (2021–2022)
In April 2021, Simanić signed for Mega Basket.

In July 2022, Simanić joined the Utah Jazz for the 2022 NBA Summer League.

Zaragoza (2022–present)
On July 20, 2022, Simanić signed with Casademont Zaragoza.

National team career
Simanić competed for the Serbian junior national teams at the 2013 under-16 European Championships, winning a silver medal at the event. One year later, he averaged 10.2 points, 4.3 boards and 1.3 blocked shots a contest throughout the tournament in Latvia.

In 2015, Simanić represented the Serbian under-18 squad at the European Championships and the under-19 team at the World Championships.

Career statistics

Euroleague

|-
| style="text-align:left;"| 2015–16
| style="text-align:left;"| Crvena zvezda
| 7 || 0 || 7.5 || .500 || .286 || 1.000 || 1.0 || 0.0 || 0.1 || 0.3 || 2.0 || 2.3
|-
| style="text-align:left;"| 2016–17
| style="text-align:left;"| Crvena zvezda
| 3 || 2 || 5.6 || .200 || .000 || .000 || 1.0 || .3 || 0.0 || 0.0 || 0.7 || -1.0
|-
| style="text-align:left;"| 2019–20
| style="text-align:left;"| Crvena zvezda
| 20 || 18 || 12:40 || .625 || .516 || .500 || 1.2 || 0.6 || 0.3 || 0.5 || 4.0 || 3.2
|-
| style="text-align:left;"| 2020–21
| style="text-align:left;"| Crvena zvezda
| 3 || 0 || 4:20 || .000 || .500 || .000 || 1.0 || 0.3 || 0.3 || 0.0 || 1.0 || 1.3
|- class="sortbottom"
| style="text-align:center;" colspan="2"| Career
| 10 || 2 || 7.0 || .400 || .222 || 1.000 || 1.0 || .1 || .1 || .2 || 1.6 || 1.3

See also 
 List of KK Crvena zvezda players with 100 games played

References

External links
 Boriša Simanić at aba-liga.com
 Boriša Simanić at eurobasket.com
 Boriša Simanić at euroleague.net

1998 births
Living people
ABA League players
Basket Zaragoza players
Basketball League of Serbia players
KK Crvena zvezda players
KK FMP players
KK Mega Basket players
Liga ACB players
Power forwards (basketball)
Serbian expatriate basketball people in Bosnia and Herzegovina
Serbian men's basketball players